Agios Ioannis Rentis is a suburb and a former municipality in the Piraeus regional unit, lying in the western part of the Athens agglomeration, Greece. Since the 2011 local government reform it is part of the municipality Nikaia-Agios Ioannis Rentis, of which it is a municipal unit.

Geography

The municipal unit has an area of 4.524 km2. The small river Cephissus runs through it. Two important transport axes pass through the municipality: Motorway 1 (Athens–Thessaloniki) and the Piraeus–Platy railway, on which it has a passenger station (Rentis) and a large marshalling yard. The Olympiakos FC training center is in this area. The Olympiacos Volleyball stadium also is nearby.

History
Agios Ioannis Rentis was part of the municipality of Athens until 1925 when it became a separate community. It was elevated to municipality status in 1946.

Economy
The Central Market of Athens is located in Agios Ioannis Rentis. It is the largest central market of vegetables, meat and other foods in Greece. In Agios Ioannis Rentis is located one of the most important industrial areas of Athens, in which factories of important companies are based, such as Rolco (Biggest detergent manufacturing company in Greece), Mietsel, Pharmasept and others.

Education
The Athens School of Fine Arts is located in Agios Ioannis Rentis.

Historical population

International relations

Agios Ioannis Rentis is twinned with Kadıköy, Turkey, since 2003.

See also
List of municipalities of Attica

References

External links
Official website 

Populated places in Piraeus (regional unit)
Nikaia-Agios Ioannis Rentis